Jāzeps is a Latvian masculine given name. It is a cognate of the given name Joseph. People bearing the name include:
Jāzeps Grosvalds (1891–1920), Latvian painter
Jāzeps Pīgoznis (1934–2014), Latvian painter
Jāzeps Vītols (1863–1948), Latvian composer
Jāzeps Vītols Latvian Academy of Music, established in 1919

References

Latvian masculine given names